"This Is Me" is a song by American girl group Dream. It was released on February 27, 2001, as the second single from their debut album It Was All a Dream (2001). It was written in by Steve Kipner, David Frank and Pamela Sheyne, the same team that wrote their debut single "He Loves U Not".

The song was a minor hit on the Billboard Hot 100, peaking within the top 40 at number 39, making this their second and final song to appear on that chart. It also peaked at numbers 13, 17, and 80 on the Mainstream Top 40, Top 40 Tracks and Hot R&B/Hip-Hop Songs charts, respectively. An accompanying music video for the song was directed by Marcus Raboy and premiered on MTV's Total Request Live. They first performed the song live on Live with Regis and Kelly and would make later appearances at the 2001 Walt Disney World Summer Jam Concert, Teen Choice Presents: Teenapalooza and The Early Show.

A second song with the same title but different lyrics and production, labeled as "This Is Me (Remix)" was released in July 2001 and features P. Diddy and Kain. A music video for "This Is Me (Remix)" was directed by Chris Robinson. This version was regularly performed live during MTV's Total Request Live Tour.

Background
Written by the same team that had produced their previous hit single, "This Is Me" again featured lead vocals by Holly Blake-Arnstein. The rap interlude was alternately sung and spoken by Ashley Poole and Melissa Schuman, respectively.

A second song with the same title but different lyrics and production, labeled as "This Is Me (Remix)" was released in July 2001 as the group's third single and features P. Diddy and Kain. "This Is Me (Remix)" was written by an entirely different group of writers than those that wrote "This is Me". "This Is Me (Remix)" was produced by Mario Winans and samples "Take Me to the Mardi Gras" by Bob James.

Music video
The music video for "This Is Me" was shot February 20 and 21, 2001, and directed by Marcus Raboy, who had also directed Dream's first video. The first setting depicted each Dream member in a different colored room: red for Holly, gold for Melissa, blue for Diana, and white for Ashley. In the second setting, the girls danced in a rave, with Ashley and Diana performing solo dance breaks. In the third setting, the girls emerged from a limousine and performed in a crowded dance club. The video debuted at number 10 on MTV's countdown show Total Request Live (TRL) on April 20, 2001. The video peaked at number one on May 2, 2001, making them the first girl group to reach that spot on the countdown.

The video for "This Is Me (Remix)" was directed by Chris Robinson and featured two settings: In the first setting, the girls, sporting "Bad Girl" T-shirts, are dancing in a blue and white room with P. Diddy also dancing and playing around with the girls. The second setting had them in a black room, with Kain performing with the girls and P. Diddy. A dance break by P. Diddy is also featured in both settings of the video, intercut with scenes of Mario Winans playing the drums.

Live performances
Dream first performed "This Is Me" along with "When I Get There" on Live with Regis and Kelly on March 27, 2001. On June 10, they performed this and "He Loves U Not" at the 2001 Walt Disney World Summer Jam Concert, aboard the Disney Wonder cruise ship in the Bahamas. A week later, they performed it at Wango Tango, an annual all-day concert organized by KIIS-FM, in California. Troy J. Augusto of Variety put their performance alongside Eden's Crush and Vertical Horizon's, saying that they were "easy to forget." On June 20, they performed it at Teen Choice Presents: Teenapalooza. Five days later, they appeared on The Early Show on June 25, 2001, to perform this and "He Loves U Not".

Track listings
US CD single
 "This Is Me" (Remix) (Featuring Kain) - 4:08
 "This Is Me" (Mike Rizzo's Hyper Mix) - 3:32

International CD single
 "This Is Me" (Radio Mix) - 3:15
 "This Is Me" (P. Diddy Mix) - 4:25
 "This Is Me" (Mike Rizzo's Hyper Mix) - 3:32
 "This Is Me" (Instrumental) - 3:11
 Track 3 is misprinted as being the "extended club" version of the Mike Rizzo mix. It is actually the short edit of his remix.

US maxi-CD single
 "This Is Me" (Remix) (Featuring Kain) - 4:38
 "This Is Me" (Mike Rizzo's Hyper Mix) - 3:32
 "This Is Me" (Urban Remix) - 4:19
 "He Loves U Not" (Remix) (Featuring G-Dep) - 3:49

12-inch remix single
 "This Is Me" (Mike Rizzo's Hyper Mix) (Extended Club) - 6:41
 "This Is Me" (Mike Rizzo's Hyper Mix) (Radio Edit) - 3:48
 "This Is Me" (Mike Rizzo's Hyper Mix) (Extended Instrumental) - 6:37
 "This Is Me" (Mike Rizzo's !Get Off The Wall!) (Vocal Radio Edit) - 3:39

Credits and personnel
Credits adapted from the liner notes of It Was All a Dream.

Recording
 Recorded and mixed at Canyon Reverb, The Village Recorder & Digital Insight, CA

Personnel
 Dave Way – mixer (Larrabee Recording Studios, CA)
 Ryan Freeman – production assistant
 Jon Griffin – production coordinator
 David Frank – keyboards, drums
 James SK Wān – bamboo flute
 Sue Anne Carwell – additional vocal arrangement

Chart performance
Though not as big of a hit as "He Loves U Not," "This Is Me" received some chart success. It peaked at number five on the U.S. Hot Dance/Maxi-Single Sales chart, number 39 on the Billboard Hot 100 for the week of June 9, 2001 and number 80 on the Hot R&B/Hip-Hop Songs chart for the week of July 27. It also charted at number 47 in New Zealand and spent three weeks in that country.

Release history

References

External links
 

2000 songs
2001 singles
Arista Records singles
Bad Boy Records singles
Dream (American group) songs
Music videos directed by Chris Robinson (director)
Music videos directed by Marcus Raboy
Songs written by David Frank (musician)
Songs written by Pam Sheyne
Songs written by Steve Kipner